Regorah is town and union council of Ziarat District in the Balochistan province of Pakistan.

References

Populated places in Ziarat District
Union councils of Balochistan, Pakistan